A Choice of Two (French: Il faut choisir) is a 1981 Canadian film written by Robert A. Duncan and directed by John Howe. It stars Alexandra Bastedo, Mavor Moore, and Leslie Nielsen.

Plot
The film stars Moore as a corporate chairman who is preparing to retire, and is choosing his successor; the candidates are a charming rogue (Nielsen) who is having an affair with the chairman's daughter (Bastedo), and a humorless schemer (Gary Reineke). However, in the process a major corporate fraud is uncovered, necessitating an investigation by Revenue Canada to identify the fraudster.

Cast 

 Alexandra Bastedo
 Mavor Moore
 Leslie Nielsen
 Richard Fitzpatrick
 Ken James
 Nuala Fitzgerald
 Budd Knapp
 Gary Reineke

Reception
Budd Knapp won the ACTRA Award for Best Supporting TV Performance at the 12th ACTRA Awards in 1983.

References

External links

1981 films
English-language Canadian films
Canadian drama films
National Film Board of Canada films
1981 drama films
Films directed by John Howe (director)
1980s English-language films
1980s Canadian films